Le Pigeon is a French bistro in Portland, Oregon's Buckman neighborhood, in the United States. Chef Gabriel Rucker opened the restaurant in 2006 at age 25.

See also

 Canard (restaurant)
 James Beard Foundation Award: 2010s
 List of French restaurants

References

External links
 
 
 
 

2006 establishments in Oregon
Buckman, Portland, Oregon
French restaurants in Portland, Oregon
Restaurants established in 2006